Carcinarctia rougeoti is a moth of the family Erebidae. It was described by Hervé de Toulgoët in 1977. It is found in Ethiopia.

References

Endemic fauna of Ethiopia
Spilosomina
Moths described in 1977
Insects of Ethiopia
Moths of Africa